KSCK may refer to:

 KSCK-LP, a low-power radio station (100.5 FM) licensed to serve Sterling City, Texas, United States
 Stockton Metropolitan Airport (ICAO code KSCK)